The 2004 VTV Cup Championship was the first edition of the tournament

Pools composition

 Vietnam (Host)
 Rahat
 Australia   
 Thailand
 Nanjing
 Yunnan

Preliminary round

|- style="background:#ffccff;" 
|1||align="left"| Rahat
|9||4||1||14||4||3.50
|- style="background:#ffccff;"
|2||align="left"| Nanjing
|9||4||1||13||5||2.60
|- style="background:#ffccff;" 
|3||align="left"| Yunnan
|8||3||2||10||11||0.91
|- style="background:#ffccff;"
|4||align="left"| Vietnam
|8||3||2||8||11||0.73
|- style="background:#ccffcc;"
|5||align="left"| Thailand
|7||2||3||6||9||0.66
|- style="background:#ccffcc;" 
|6||align="left"| Australia
|5||0||5||4||15||0.27
|}

|}

Final round

3rd place

|}

Final

|}

Final standing

Awards
MVP:  Yelena Pavlova
Best Spiker:  Zhou Yuan
Best Blocker:  Nguyễn Thị Ngọc Hoa
Best Setter:  Bai Rui Qi
Best Server:  Tregenza Melanie
Best Digger:  Konwika  Apinyapong
Best Libero:  Kananovich Iryna
Miss VTV Cup 2004:  Phạm Thị Kim Huệ

References

VTV International Women's Volleyball Cup
VTV
VTV